The Victorian Premier's Unpublished Manuscript Award is a literary award for an unpublished manuscript. It can be entered by any author from the Australian State of Victoria that has not published a project based on fiction.

The Award was established by the State Library of Australia in 2003. In 2011 administration of the Victorian Premier's Literary Awards changed to the Wheeler Centre. As of 2017 is valued at A$15,000.

Winners and shortlists

Notes

References 

Victorian Premier's Literary Awards
Literary awards honoring unpublished books or writers
Awards established in 2003